Borawski is a Polish language habitational surname for someone from a place called Borawe, Borawskie, or Borawy. Notable people with the name include:

 Edmund Borawski (1946), Polish politician
 Grzegorz Borawski (1967), retired Polish football defender
 Walta Borawski (1947–1994), American poet

References 

Polish-language surnames
Polish toponymic surnames